Sphaeriodiscus is a genus of echinoderms belonging to the family Goniasteridae.

The genus has almost cosmopolitan distribution.

Species:

Sphaeriodiscus ammophilus 
Sphaeriodiscus biomaglo 
Sphaeriodiscus bourgeti 
Sphaeriodiscus ganae 
Sphaeriodiscus inaequalis 
Sphaeriodiscus irritatus 
Sphaeriodiscus maui 
Sphaeriodiscus mirabilis 
Sphaeriodiscus scotocryptus

References

Goniasteridae
Asteroidea genera